This is a list of Canadian films which were released in 1985:

See also
 1985 in Canada
 1985 in Canadian television

1985
1985 in Canadian cinema
Canada